Club Social y Deportivo Municipal, also known as  Municipal or Los Rojos (the Reds), is a Guatemalan professional football club based in Guatemala City.

They compete in the Liga Nacional, the top tier of Guatemalan football, and play their home matches at the Estadio El Trébol. As of 2015, they are the team that has remained the most years at the top level in Guatemala, having done so since the inception of the national league in 1942. They have won the domestic league 31 times; most recently winning the 2019 Apertura tournament. They won the CONCACAF Champions' Cup in 1974.

Municipal is the most popular football club in Guatemala and are traditional arch-rivals of Comunicaciones, who is also based in Guatemala City, and with whom they share the lead in all-time league titles in the country with 31 each as of 2022.

History
The club was founded on May 17, 1936 by workers of the Ayuntamiento (city hall) of the Guatemala City municipality, hence the name Municipal.  They were first promoted to the top division, (then called Liga Capitalina) in 1938. They finished in second place in their debut season, and have since remained in the top division.

Early domestic success (1940s–1960s)
The team won its first national league title in the 1942–43 tournament, the first ever official national league championship in Guatemala. They won three of the following six tournaments, the other three being won by Tipografía Nacional, whom which they had their first known rivalry. Municipal were coached by Manuel Felipe Carrera, one of the original founders of the club, and whose name was later given to the stadium where the team currently practices.

During the 1940s and early 1950s, Municipal's most iconic player was the forward Carlos "Pepino" Toledo, who wore the red shirt throughout his career. He helped the club win their first four league titles, the last of them coming at the 1954–55 tournament (also the year Toledo retired).  His career total of 129 goals remains the fourth-highest in club history.  He was also one of Guatemala's first national stars and was chosen for the national team. Later, he became Municipal's coach.

In 1948, Municipal won its first international honors at a friendly tournament held in Havana, Cuba to commemorate the Cuban Independence. That squad featured Toledo, Mario Camposeco, and goalkeeper José Pedro "Tarzán" Segura.

The end of the 1950s were a darker time for Municipal.  Toledo had retired and Comunicaciones had dethroned them at the top of the league, winning it three years in a row.  Municipal struggled through an eight-year title drought.  They managed to break that drought with three championships in the 1960s (1963–64, 1965–66, and 1969–70), but Comunicaciones remained Guatemala's dominant team, winning seven titles in fourteen years from 1956-72.  The Comunicaciones-Municipal match emerged as a high-profile local derby, the biggest in the country.  Another rivalry developed with a third Guatemala City club, Aurora, which also won three titles during this time.

1970s: First international success
In 1973, Uruguayan coach Rubén Amorín arrived at Municipal.  He managed a group of players that included defender Alberto López Oliva, midfielders Benjamín Monterroso and José Emilio "Pepe" Mitrovich, and forward Julio César Anderson.  Anderson would become the club's highest ever goalscorer, and help lead the team to its era of greatest glory.  Municipal won league championships in both 1973 and 1974 (their first-ever repeat titles).  In 1974, the same year that they were marching to a dominant repeat championship, they also became the first Guatemalan club to win the CONCACAF Champions' Cup.  The Rojos then went on to play the Copa Interamericana against Argentina's "red team", Independiente.

The first leg was played in Guatemala on November 24, 1974, and Independiente won, 1-0.  However, Municipal surprised the continent by winning 1-0 in Argentina two days later.  The hero was Argentine-born José Emilio "Pepe" Mitrovich in the second half. With both teams equal in points and goal difference, the match went to extra time.  No further goals were scored, and the match went into penalty kicks.  Misses by Julio César "Morocho" Anderson and Benjamín "Mincho" Monterroso allowed Independiente to prevail, 4-2, but Municipal had earned continental respect.

1980s: Almost relegated
Municipal's glory years continued with another league title in 1976, but their results began to fade.  They finished 8th in 1979-80, and in 1981 they fell even further to 11th, forcing them into a relegation mini-league.  Ironically, their safety was secured when old rivals Tipografía Nacional were relegated instead.  In 1982, the club came even closer to oblivion, finishing 9th in the regular season.  That result put them back in the relegation mini-league, and this time they escaped only on goal differential.  Over the next several years, Municipal put some distance between themselves and the bottom of the table, but they would not seriously challenge for another title until 1987.

1980s and 1990s: Return to the top
1987 was the year that Argentine coach Miguel Ángel Brindisi arrived in Guatemala City. A former midfield star who had won two Argentine titles and played a stint in Spain, he came to Municipal with just one previous year of managerial experience.  His two years in Guatemala saw brilliant success.  In 1987, they beat Aurora 4-2 on penalties to win a championship playoff and claim the Guatemalan title for the first time since 1976.  A year later, they repeated as champs for the first time since the early 1970s.  Brindisi moved on to a new job managing Barcelona SC in Ecuador, but successor Walter Ormeño kept the momentum going by guiding the team to a third straight crown.

In 1990-91, Municipal came within one match of a fourth straight title, but bowed 1-0 to Comunicaciones in the championship final.  They avenged that defeat in 1991-92, beating Comunicaciones 2-1 in a championship playoff replay.  That made it four titles in five years.

The team reached the finals of the CONCACAF Champions Cup in December 1993, narrowly losing out to Costa Rican champions Saprissa.  They did manage to claim some silverware from the season, winning the Guatemalan championship for the fifth time in seven seasons.

2000s: A Decade of Success
In 2000, after the league's competition format was changed to two yearly tournaments on the Apertura and Clausura fashion, Municipal won the title again after Comunicaciones had set a record by winning the previous four; Municipal surpassed that record in 2006 when they won the 2006 Apertura tournament, their fifth consecutive title, under coach Enzo Trossero. They also added third and fourth Central American titles by winning the Copa Interclubes UNCAF in 2001 and 2004.

Colours and crest
Initially, the team's uniform colors consisted of a red-and-black striped shirt and black shorts. The colours soon changed to the current red shirt and blue shorts for home matches, and all blue for away matches, although other colors have been used for away matches.

The club's logo is based in the emblem of the Municipalidad de Guatemala, which is itself based in the original coat of arms of the city of Santiago de los Caballeros de Guatemala, with the image of Apostle Santiago (Saint James) over the stylized scenery of the region. The team's version includes an image of the type of ball used at the time the club was founded, next to a blue and red striped canton in between the former two elements. The circular field is surrounded by the name of the team on a red background.

Stadium
Throughout the years, Municipal has used the Estadio Mateo Flores as their home ground, sharing it with Comunicaciones since the 1950s until 1991, and again starting in 2005. Other stadiums hosted Municipal in the beginning, namely the Estadio Autonomía. The Estadio La Pedrera has been used when the Mateo Flores has not been available and houses a soup kitchen in the basement. The Estadio Manuel Felipe Carrera, also known as "Estadio El Trébol", has been the training venue for the team, and it has been occasionally used for official matches by the club; Municipal had an undefeated streak of 33 official matches in this ground from July 9, 1991 until March 7, 2008, when they lost to Deportivo Petapa 1–0 for the 2008 Clausura tournament.

Supporters
Municipal is believed to have the largest fan base of all Guatemalan clubs, and that their popularity have earned them nicknames like El mimado de la afición (Fans' pampered team) and El equipo del pueblo (People's team).

Statistics and records
Municipal has set a record in Guatemalan football by being the club that has spent the most consecutive seasons in the maximum division, having remained there uninterruptedly since 1938.

Juan Carlos Plata is the team's all-time top goalscorer in league matches and overall. As of the end of 2010, Plata has scored 299 league goals and 403 overall goals with Municipal, the only club he has played for.

Honours

Domestic
League
 Liga Nacional de Guatemala and predecessors 
 Champions (31): 1942–43, 1947, 1950–51, 1954–55, 1963–64, 1965–66, 1969–70, 1973, 1974, 1976, 1987, 1988–89, 1989–90, 1991–92, 1993–94, Clausura 2000, Apertura 2000, Apertura 2001, Clausura 2002, Apertura 2003, Apertura 2004, Clausura 2005, Apertura 2005, Clausura 2006, Apertura 2006, Clausura 2008, Apertura 2009, Clausura 2010, Apertura 2011, Clausura 2017, Apertura 2019

Cup
 Copa de Guatemala and predecessors 
 Champions (8): 1960, 1967, 1969, 1994–95, 1995–96, 1998–99, 2003, 2003–04
 Campeón de Campeones (Super Cup) and predecessors 
 Champions (5): 1952, 1967, 1977, 1994, 1996

Continental
 CONCACAF Champions' Cup 
 Champions (1): 1974
 UNCAF Interclub Cup 
 Champions (4): 1974, 1977, 2001, 2004
 Copa Interamericana 
 Runners-up (1): 1974

Players

Current squad

Retired numbers
15 –  Juan Carlos Plata, forward (1990–2010)

Notable players
Players with at least two years of service for the club are listed here.
Former

 Miguel Ángel Brindisi (1984–1985)
 Martín Crossa (2009–2010)
  José Emilio Mitrovich (MF), (1970's)
 Josimar Arias (2012)
 Rónald Gómez (1998–1999)
 Eliseo Quintanilla  (FW) (2011–2012)
 José Luis Rugamas (1984–1986)
 José Pedro "Tarzan" Segura (GK) (1946–1950)
 Mario Acevedo (FW), (2001–2009)
 Julio César Anderson (FW), (1969–1984)
 Carlos Figueroa (MF), (2001–2003), (2004–2007), (2009–2010)
Guillermo Ramirez (FW/MF), (1997–2000), (2003–2008), (2010–2011)
 Juan Manuel Funes (MF), (1986–1997)
 Freddy García (MF), (2003–2004), (2004–2009)
  Óscar Isaula (2011–2012)
 Alberto López Oliva (DF), (1963–1978)
 Benjamín Monterroso (DF / MF), (1970–1979)
 Juan Carlos Plata (FW), (1989–2010)
 Selvyn Ponciano (DF), (1994–2009)
 Julio Rodas (FW), (1988–1994)
 Sergio Guevara (MF), (2003–2011)
 German Ruano (DF), (1993–2009)
 Carlos Ruiz (FW), (1997–2001), (2014–2016)
 Carlos Toledo (FW), (1938–1955)
 Pablo Hutt (MF), (2011)
 Juan Manuel Romo (GK), (1983–90)
 Kassius Ettienne (MF), (2010–2012)
 Jaime Penedo (GK), (2007–2013)
 Edgar Aguilera (2001–2002)
 Richart Báez (2003–04)
 Julio César Cortés (MF), (1973–1974)
 Carlos Nicola (2003–2005)
 Gonzalo Romero (1997–98), (2000–2011)
 Guillermo Lobos (DF), (1942–1955)
 Claudio Albizuris (MF), (2000–10), (2011–2017)
 Jaime Alas (MF), (2016-)
 Marco Pappa (MF), (2006–2008), (2017–2018)
 Felipe Baloy (DF), (2017-2018)
 Blas Perez (FW), (2017-2018)
 Paulo Motta (GK), (2004–2008), (2014–2018)
 Nicholas Hagen (GK), (2015–2020)

Managerial history

Champion coaches

 Sebastián Bini (Apertura 2019)

List of coaches

 Jaime Borja (1957)
 Ferenc Mészáros (1967–1968)
 Rolando Torino (1986)
 Gustavo Faral (1996)
 Horacio Cordero (2000–2001)
 Ever Hugo Almeida (2001–2004)
 Enzo Trossero (2004–2006)
 Victor Hugo Monzon (Jul 2007-Oct 2007)
 Jorge José Benítez (Oct 2007–Apr 2008)
 Horacio Cordero (Apr 2008-Dec 2008)
 Carlos Ruiz (Jan 2009-Nov 2009)
Jorge Habbegger (Nov 2009-Mar2010)
Manuel Keosseian (Apr 2010-Jun 2010)
 Guilherme Farinha (2010)
 Javier Delgado (May 2011–Oct 2012)
 Ramón Maradiaga (Oct 2012–Feb 2013)
 Fernando Díaz (Feb 2013–Dec 2013)
 Aníbal Ruiz (Dec 2013–Sept 2014)
  Manuel Keosseián (Oct 2014–Dec 2014)
 Enzo Trossero (Jan 2015–May 2015)
 Mauricio Wright (Jul 2015–Nov 2015)
 Gustavo Machain (Nov 2015–Oct 2017)
 Ever Hugo Almeida (Oct 2017–Dec 2017)
  Hernán Medford (Jan 2018–Sep 2018)
 Horacio Cordero (Sep 2018-Sep 2019)
 Sebastián Bini (Sep 2019-May 2021)
 José Cardozo (May 2021-May 2022)
 Juan Antonio Torres (Jun 2022-Oct 2022)
 José Cardozo (Oct 2022- )

References and notes

Further reading

External links

 Official web site

Football clubs in Guatemala
Football clubs in Guatemala City
Association football clubs established in 1936
 
1936 establishments in Guatemala
Works association football teams
M
M